Norsk-Tysk Tidsskrift was a Norwegian periodical, in existence during the German occupation of Norway.

It was published on a monthly basis from 1942 by the Norwegian-German cultural society Norsk-Tysk Selskap. It was stopped after the liberation of Norway 1945, when Norsk-Tysk Selskap was disestablished.

References

1942 establishments in Norway
1945 disestablishments in Norway
Defunct newspapers published in Norway
Nazi newspapers
Newspapers established in 1942
Publications disestablished in 1945
Monthly newspapers